Steele's Greenville expedition took place from April 2 to 25, 1863, during the Vicksburg campaign of the American Civil War.  Union forces commanded by Major General Frederick Steele occupied Greenville, Mississippi, and operated in the surrounding area, to divert Confederate attention from a more important movement made in Louisiana by Major General John A. McClernand's corps.  Minor skirmishing between the two sides occurred, particularly in the early stages of the expedition.  Over 1,000 slaves were freed during the operation, and large quantities of supplies and animals were destroyed or removed from the area.  Along with other operations, including Grierson's Raid, Steele's Greenville expedition distracted Confederate attention from McClernand's movement.  Some historians have suggested that the Greenville expedition represented Union war policy shifting more towards expanding the war to Confederate social and economic structures and the Confederate homefront.

Background

During early 1863, with the American Civil War ongoing, Union Army forces commanded by Major General Ulysses S. Grant were undertaking the Vicksburg campaign against the Confederate-held city of Vicksburg, Mississippi.  After having repeatedly failed to maneuver out of the surrounding swamps and onto high ground near Vicksburg, Grant decided between three options: an amphibious crossing of the Mississippi River and attack of the Confederate riverfront defenses; pulling back to Memphis, Tennessee, and then making an overland drive south to Vicksburg; and moving south of Vicksburg and then crossing the Mississippi River to operate against the city.  The first option risked heavy casualties and the second could be misconstrued as a retreat by the civilian population and political authorities, so Grant chose the third option.  In late March, Grant ordered the XIII Corps, commanded by Major General John A. McClernand, to move down the Louisiana side of the Mississippi River and then prepare to cross the river at a point south of Vicksburg.

As part of an attempt to distract the Confederate forces at Vicksburg, who were commanded by Lieutenant General John C. Pemberton, from McClernand's movement, Grant sent the division of Major General Frederick Steele to Greenville, Mississippi, which was roughly  upriver from Vicksburg.  Steele's instructions were to land in the Mississippi Delta, advance to Greenville, and then operate in the Deer Creek area.  Once there, the Union soldiers were to burn any baled cotton marked with "CSA", clear out any Confederate forces in the area, and burn abandoned plantations. About 5,600 men of Steele's division were part of the expedition. Lieutenant Colonel Samuel W. Ferguson commanded the Confederate forces in the area.

Expedition
Steele's troops left the Young's Point, Louisiana area late on April 2, heading upriver via steamboats. The next morning, the boats reached Smith's Landing, and on either the next day or April 5, reached Washington's Landing, which was south of Greenville. While much of Steele's force remained the Washington's Landing area, detachments patrolled inward, learning that the path to Deer Creek was flooded and that a large stash of cotton known to be in the area had already been burned. Two regiments and the Union Navy vessel USS Prairie Bird were left at the landing point to guard it.

Steele's pioneer force rebuilt a bridge over Fish Lake, and continued on inland; the Union commander learned of the presence of Ferguson's Confederates on April 6. The Union officers pushed their men hard, hoping to overtake and capture the Confederate force. Ferguson had known of the Union presence since not long after the landing, and he sent a messenger to Major General Carter L. Stevenson at Vicksburg, asking for instructions. Stevenson detached the brigade of Brigadier General Stephen Dill Lee to the area, with orders to secure Rolling Fork and then move up the Bogue Phalia stream and strike Steele's rear. Between the commands of Ferguson and Lee, the Confederates had about 4,300 men.

Ferguson prepared a delaying action. When, on the afternoon of April 7, Steele's column approached the plantation, Ferguson had Bledsoe's Missouri Battery and Sengstak's Alabama Battery open fire on them. During the pursuit, Union troops stumbled across the body of a lynched African-American, who had allegedly mistaken Ferguson's troops for Union forces, asked for a gun with which to kill his master, and expressed intent to rape women. The presence of Lee's force became known to Steele, and he ordered a withdrawal, not wanting to fight both Confederate forces too far from Greenville. 
During the march back, the Union troops destroyed supplies and took horses, mules, and livestock from the surrounding area.  The Confederates pursued, and the Union troops skirmished with them on April 8 and 10.  The latter skirmish took place at Fish Lake and ended with the Union troops burning the bridge across the body of water.

During the movements, large numbers of slaves flocked to the Union lines and followed the troops to gain their freedom.  Steele did not want this, and encouraged them to remain on plantations; when the campaign began, he had been ordered to discourage slaves from fleeing to Union lines.  Unsure of what to do with the large number of followers, Steele sent a message to Major General William T. Sherman, but when Sherman did not respond, contacted Grant.  Grant advised Steele to encourage slaves to come to Union lines, and suggested that he should form regiments of United States Colored Troops out of male former slaves who volunteered for military services, much as Brigadier General Lorenzo Thomas had begun doing.  About 500 African-Americans volunteered for the service, placed in new regiments to be led by white officers.

April 13 saw Union troops make another sweep of the Greenville area.  While Ferguson had withdrawn his troops, the Union soldiers found large quantities of supplies and cattle, which they brought back to camp.  Shortly thereafter, Lee's command withdrew from the area.  On April 20, Steele sent the 3rd and 31st Missouri Infantry Regiments to the Williams Bayou area; they returned on April 22 with quantities of mules, corn, and livestock. While the Union troops had been ordered to avoid disturbing local families who were peaceful and remained at home, these orders were ignored.  Many of the plantations in the area were burned, and hard feelings against the Union forces grew among the local populace.  In total, during the expedition, over 1,000 slaves were freed, and Union forces took more than 1,000 animals, besides destroying  of corn. On April 22, Grant instructed Steele to return from the Greenville area, but a shortage of transports prevented the Union soldiers from setting off until late on April 24.  The next morning, Steele's men returned to Young's Point.

Aftermath

In the words of James H. Wilson, Steele's Greenville expedition made the Union army an implement of "agricultural disorganization and distress as well as of emancipation". Both Sherman and Steele believed that Union troops had gone too far in behavior that affected civilians, rather than just targeted the Confederate war goals. The historians William L. Shea and Terrence J. Winschel see the expedition as demonstrating a shift in the Union's war policy. In an earlier communication, Henry Halleck had written to Grant that he believed that there would be "no peace but that which is forced by the sword".  Grant accepted the policy of carrying the war to the social and economic structures of the Confederacy.  Going forward, in the words of Shea and Winschel, the Union army was to "bring the war home to [Confederate] civilians by enforcing emancipation and seizing or destroying all items of possible military value".  Besides ravaging an area important to the Confederate forces at Vicksburg of supplies, the Greenville expedition also drew Confederate attention away from McClernand's more important operations in Louisiana, although other operations such as Grierson's Raid also played a role in that.

In late April, Union forces crossed the Mississippi River south of Vicksburg and then moved inland.  The Union troops defeated a Confederate force in the Battle of Port Gibson on May 1, and on May 12 won another victory in the Battle of Raymond.  After the action at Raymond, Grant decided to strike a Confederate force forming at Jackson, Mississippi, and then turn west towards Vicksburg.  Grant's men won a small battle at Jackson on May 14, and then defeated Pemberton's army in the climactic Battle of Champion Hill on May 16.  After another Confederate defeat at the Battle of Big Black River Bridge on May 17, the Siege of Vicksburg began on May 18.  When the city surrendered on July 4, it was a major defeat for the Confederacy.

References

Sources
 
 

 
 

Vicksburg campaign
Military operations of the American Civil War in Mississippi
1863 in Mississippi
April 1863 events